Grevillea amplexans is a species of flowering plant in the family Proteaceae and is endemic to the Mid West region of Western Australia. It is a spreading shrub with arching branches, stem-clasping, sharply-pointed, lobed or toothed leaves and white to cream-coloured flowers.

Description
The flowers are arranged in more or less spherical to domed groups on the ends of branches.

Taxonomy
Grevillea amplexans was first formally described in 1870 by George Bentham from an unpublished description by Ferdinand von Mueller in Flora Australiensis. The specific epithet (amplexans) means "encircling" or "embracing", referring to the base of the leaves.

In 2000, Makinson and Wilson described three subspecies in the Flora of Australia, and the names are accepted by the Australian Plant Census:
 Grevillea amplexans subsp. adpressa (Olde & Marriott) Makinson tends to have smaller leaves than subsp. amplexans and often has down-curved leaf edges;
 Grevillea amplexans F.Muell. ex Benth. subsp. amplexans;
 Grevillea amplexans subsp. semivestita Makinson is distinguished from the autonym by its silky-hairy branchlets and glabrous, sometimes glaucous lower leaf surfaces.

(Grevillea amplexans subsp. adpressa was first formally described in 1993 by Olde and Marriott who gave it the name Grevillea adpressa in the journal Nuytsia.)

Distribution and habitat
This grevillea grows in sand on sandplains between Geraldton, Coomberdale and Moora in the Avon Wheatbelt, Geraldton Sandplains and Swan Coastal Plain biogeographic regions of Western Australia. Subspecies adpressa grows in low heath between Mingenew and Watheroo, and subsp. amplexans grows in heathland or mallee-shrubland and subsp. semivestita occurs in shrubland and heath from Watheroo National Park to near Carnamah.

Conservation status
Subspecies amplexans is classified as "not threatened" by the Government of Western Australia Department of Biodiversity, Conservation and Attractions, but subsp. adpressa is listed as "Priority One" meaning that it is known from only one or a few locations which are potentially at risk, and subsp. semivestita as "Priority Two" meaning that it is poorly known and from only one or a few locations.

References

amplexans
Endemic flora of Western Australia
Eudicots of Western Australia
Proteales of Australia
Taxa named by George Bentham
Taxa named by Ferdinand von Mueller
Plants described in 1870